Nordlys ("Northern Light" in Norwegian) is the second full-length studio album by the German symphonic/folk metal band Midnattsol. It was released on 28 March 2008 through Napalm Records.

Background 
After three years of the release of their well-received debut album Where Twilight Dwells (2005), Midnattsol decided change direction and to compose an album with  dark atmospheres in a melodic and heavy sound, influenced more closely by traditional gothic metal. In contrast, Nordlys is little inspired by Nordic folk metal and it is less introspective that its predecessor.

Particularly noteworthy is the experimentation in the vocals of their lead singer Carmen Elise Espenæs, as well as the extensive dedication in the guitar solos of Daniel Droste and Christian Hector. However, Hector (a founding member), left the group shortly after the release of the album in order to concentrate on his other band Ahab, being briefly replaced by Fabian Pospiech in the three live performances that made Midnattsol in Europe to promote the album.

Track listing

Personnel

Midnattsol
 Carmen Elise Espenæs – Vocals
 Birgit Öllbrunner – Bass & Acoustic Bass
 Daniel Droste – Lead Guitar & Acoustic Guitar & Vocals
 Christian Hector – Rhythm Guitar & Acoustic Guitar
 Daniel Fischer – Keyboards
 Chris Merzinsky – Drums & Percussion

Production
 Markus Stock - producer, engineer
 Alexander Krull, Thorsten Bauer - producers and  recording engineers of vocals
 Tue Madsen - mixing
 Mika Jussila - mastering
 Ingo Römling - artwork
 Jens Howorka - photography

References 

2008 albums
Midnattsol albums
Napalm Records albums
Albums produced by Alexander Krull

pt:Nordlys